William Frank is the name of:

 William Frank (politician) (1923–2023), Canadian politician
 Bill Frank (1938–2014), former offensive lineman in the Canadian Football League
 William J. Frank (born 1960), American politician
 Billy Frank (cricketer) (1872–1945), South African cricketer
 Billy Frank Jr. (1931–2014), Native American environmental leader and treaty rights activist
 William Frank (athlete) (1878–1965), U.S. athlete

See also
 Billie Frank (disambiguation)
 William Francis (disambiguation)